Oksu-dong is a dong, (neighbourhood), of Seongdong-gu in Seoul, South Korea.

History 
During the Japanese occupation of Korea, Oksu-dong was a small hamlet known as Doomo-Village (두모리; 豆毛里) belonging to Hanji (한지면; 漢芝面) within Goyang County (고양군 高陽郡) and lying close near Han river.

See also 
Administrative divisions of South Korea

References

External links
 Seongdong-gu Official site in English
 Seongdong-gu Official website
 Map of Seongdong-gu
 Oksu 1-dong Resident office 

Neighbourhoods of Seongdong District